The western dwarf squirrel (Microsciurus mimulus) is a small tree squirrel in the genus Microsciurus and tribe Sciurini found in Colombia, Ecuador, and Panama.

The table below lists the three recognized subspecies of Microsciurus mimulus, along with any synonyms associated with each subspecies:

References

Microsciurus
Mammals of Colombia
Mammals described in 1898
Taxa named by Oldfield Thomas
Taxonomy articles created by Polbot